Upadhyaya is a Brahmin name from Sanskrit upādhyāya "teacher" (from upa ‘with, under’ + adhyāya ‘studying’).

Notable people

Amar Upadhyay, Indian model, film and television actor
Amod Prasad Upadhyay (born 1936), Nepalese social worker and politician
Ayodhya Prasad Upadhyay (1865–1947), writer of Hindi literature
Brahmabandhav Upadhyay (1861–1907), Bengali Brahmin, nephew of the Indian freedom-fighter Kalicharan Banerjee
Chabilal Upadhyaya (1882–1980), Nepali Brahmin(Bahun), First President (Selected) of Assam Pradesh Congress Committee
Chintan Upadhyay (born 1972), Indian artist, accused of a 2015 murder
Chandrika Prasad Upadhyay, Indian politician
Deendayal Upadhyaya (1916–1968), Indian politician and thinker, co-founder of the political party Bharatiya Jana Sangh
Darshan Upadhyaya, Canada-born American esports player
Harilal Upadhyay (1916–1994), Gujarati author
Hema Upadhyay (1972–2015), Indian artist who lived and worked in Mumbai, India since 1998
Kedar Nath Upadhyay, Chief Justice of Nepal at Supreme Court
Kishore Upadhyaya, Indian politician
Krishnakant Upadhyay (born 1986), cricketer from Uttar Pradesh
Lalit Upadhyay, Indian field hockey player, part of Indian national team
Munishwar Dutt Upadhyay, Indian politician and statesman, leader in the Indian independence movement
Ram Kinkar Upadhyay, scholar on Indian scriptures and a recipient of Padma Bhushan
Samrat Upadhyay, Nepalese writer who writes in English
Satish Upadhyay (born 1962), the President of the Delhi Unit of Bharatiya Janata Party (BJP)
Seema Upadhyay (born 1965), Indian politician, belonging to Bahujan Samaj Party
Shailendra Kumar Upadhyay, Nepalese diplomat and politician
Shrikrishna Upadhyay (born 1945), Nepalese economist
Umesh Upadhyay, Indian television journalist and media executive
Vikas Upadhyay (born 1975), Indian politician, general secretary for All India Youth Congress

In Jainism
In Jainism, an upadhyay is the second highest leader of a Jain ascetic order after an acharya. The Fourth Shloka of the Namokar Mantra says Namo Uvvajhayanam meaning bow to all upadhyayas.

See also
Neupane
Upreti
Upamanyu
Jha
Mishra

References

Indian surnames
Hindu surnames
Surnames of Indian origin
Culture of Bihar
Bihari-language surnames
Mithila
Culture of Mithila